Cyberstrike 2 is a mech simulation game developed by Simutronics and published by 989 Studios for Microsoft Windows in 1998. It is the sequel to CyberStrike.

Development
The game was in development as early as July 1997.It was originally scheduled to release on January 15, 1998.

Reception

The game received average reviews from critics.

References

External links

1998 video games
Multiplayer online games
Vehicle simulation games
Video game sequels
Video games about mecha
Video games developed in the United States
Windows games
Windows-only games